Illois may refer to:

 Illois, the Finland-Swedish name of Illoinen, a district of the city of Turku, in Finland
 Illois, Seine-Maritime, a commune of the Seine-Maritime département in France